Liliane Lisbeth Clase Báez (born 29 July 2003) is a Dominican footballer who plays as a right winger for Delfines del Este FC and the Dominican Republic women's national team.

International career
Clase has appeared for the Dominican Republic at the 2020 CONCACAF Women's Olympic Qualifying Championship qualification.

References

External links

2003 births
Living people
Women's association football wingers
Dominican Republic women's footballers
Dominican Republic women's international footballers